Stephen Sean Eskinazi (born 28 March 1994) is an Australian cricketer who plays for Middlesex and the Perth Scorchers. 

Born in South Africa and raised in Australia, he is a dual citizen of Australia and the United Kingdom. Eskinazi is a right-handed batsman who is also an occasional wicketkeeper.

Career
Eskinazi was born in Johannesburg, South Africa to an English mother and a Zimbabwean father. He moved with his family to Australia at a young age. Eskinazi attended high school at Christ Church Grammar School, Perth, later attending the University of Western Australia. He holds British and Australian citizenship.

Eskinazi made his List A debut for Middlesex in the 2018 Royal London One-Day Cup on 17 May 2018. He was awarded his county cap by club president John Emburey during the County Championship match versus Derbyshire at Lord's in September 2018. During the enforced absence of Peter Handscomb due to the COVID-19 pandemic, he was appointed club captain during the 2020 season. 

On 24 June 2021, in the 2021 T20 Blast, Eskinazi scored his first century in a T20 match, with an unbeaten 102 runs.

He replaced Eoin Morgan as t20 captain for the 2022 season.

References

External links
 

1994 births
Living people
English cricketers
Middlesex cricket captains
Middlesex cricketers
People educated at Christ Church Grammar School
People from Johannesburg 
Wicket-keepers